K. Chakravarthi (born Kommineni Appa Rao; 8 September 1936 – 3 February 2002) was an Indian music director who primarily worked in Telugu cinema. He made his debut with in 1971 with Mooga Prema and went on compose music for over 949 films, predominantly in Telugu language (884 films), followed by Kannada (60 films). He won two Nandi Awards.

Personal life
Chakravarthi was born as Kommineni Appa Rao on 8 September 1936 in Ponnekallu, Guntur District of present-day Andhra Pradesh. He had three sons, including Sri Kommineni who was also a music director and a playback singer.

Career
Chakravarthi learned classical vocal from Mahavadi Venkatappaiah. He formed a music troupe called Vinod Orchestra in Guntur and organised light music concerts. Those days, Mangapati of HMV identified his talent and invited him to Madras. HMV released two private records, which includes "Kanna Nenoka Kala".

Film career
His first film in Telugu, Mooga Prema was released in 1971;It was his Friend K.Chatterjee keeping faith in his talent renamed him as "Chakravarthy" from "Apparao' so that he will do justice to that Royal category in his profession.Ultimately his creativity soared to new heights with more than 5000 song compositions to his credit.Another version—before this film he composed background music for a Hindi movie, in that movie titles his name was wrongly mentioned as Chakravarthi, actually it is Apparao; then he continued as Chakravarthy. Mooga Prema film was not a good hit at the box-office, Saradha (1973) gave him a good hit, but after this film also he was not well recognized.

In 1977, Yamagola was released and this was the great turning point of his career. In this N. T. Rama Rao movie directed by T. Rama Rao ,he introduced a new trend with S. P. Balasubrahmanyam by making him sing with voice modulation close to actor's voice.With V. Madhusudhana Rao 1978 film Mallepoovu he became an architect for musical extravaganza.He abstained from reproducing Dada S. D. Burman tunes for base Hindi film Pyaasa thus proving his mettle as an able composer and silenced critics from assigning him a mass,commercial,fast beat composer tag.  His music score for movie Khaidi (1983 film) provided much needed commercial break in career for actor Chiranjeevi and Director A. Kodandarami Reddy . His music for Neti Bharatam  and      Pratighatana proved vital for actress Vijayashanti stardom. He rendered nice popular compositions in Dasari Narayana Rao favourite ragas Shivaranjani , Bhupalam for films Balipeetam, Premabhishekam (1981 film) , Srivari Muchatlu directed by him. Eventually he contributed for Akkineni Nageswara Rao career growth as well. His score for Pasivadi Pranam with electronic orchestration was a boom,much needed relief for actor Chiranejevi after some slack period.
 
His lack of exposure to musical stalwarts in Gharana and Calcutta, Mumbai film industry has never been a hurdle for his growth as a successful composer. He very well knew about his limitations and excelled based on his intuitions and exemplary natural creativity. Critics agreed upon this, as he was hardly spending 30 minutes to compose a song.During his peak of career he was recording more than 5 songs in a day working 16 hrs per day.   
He realized his potential in folk music and intelligently blended it with classical ragas.Proved the fact that music is boundless and it is mass entertainment,not just pundits makes any art worthy.Established unique style of his own. He was humble and down to earth and always respected,proclaimed K. V. Mahadevan as genius in contemporary musicians.He was conducting music for him in his early days of career before 1970.
 
His main assistants Krishna-Chakra duo remained loyal to him throughout his career though once in a while they had their own scores.
Raj-Koti duo assisted him for several years. 
M. M. Keeravani was his assistant. He introduced several singers with talent to industry.S. P. Sailaja , Vandemataram Srinivas are notable singers introduced by him.
Famous music director Nartanasala fame Susarla Dakshinamurthi worked some time with his team

He was a dubbing artiste and lent his voice in 600 movies. He also penned lyrics for a few songs. He was also a singer and acted in a few films.

Death 
Chakravarthy died on 3 February 2002 due to age related ailments.

Filmography
https://en.wikipedia.org/wiki/Category:Films_scored_by_K._Chakravarthy

Mooga Prema (1971)
Saradha (1973)
Evariki Vaare Yamuna Teere (1974)
Babu (1975)
Cheekati velugulu (1975)
Jebu Donga-Sobhan Babu (1975)
Balipeetam (1975)
Jyoti (1976)
Kalpana-Telugu Movie (1977)
Aame Katha (1977)
Yamagola (1977)
Mallepoovu (1978)
Padaharella Vayasu (1978)
Pranam Khareedu (1978)
Vetagadu (1979)
Driver Ramudu (1979)
Mosagadu (1980)
Yedanthasthula Meda (1980)
Buchi Babu (1980)
Nippulanti Nijam (1980)
Pandanti Jeevitam-Telugu movie (1980)
Premabhishekam (1981)
Viswaroopam (1981 film) (1981)
Erra Mallelu (1981)
Nyayam kavali (1981)
Prema Kanuka (1981)
Varalabbai (1981)
Illalu-Sobhanbabu (1981)
Srivari Muchatlu (1981)
Ooruki Monagadu (1981)
Pakkinti Ammayi (1981)
Maha Purushudu (1981)
Kondaveeti Simham(1982)
Justice Chowdary(1982)
Devatha (1982)
Pagadai Panirendu (1982) (Tamil)
Idi Pellantara (1982)
Prema Murthulu-Telugu movie (1982)
Yuvaraju (1982)
Gopala Krishnudu (1982)
Vamsha Gouravam-Telugu Movie (1982)
Prathikaram-Telugu movie (1982)
Raaga Deepam (1982)
Maga Maharaju(1983)
Neti Bharatam (1983)
Khaidi (1983) (Telugu)
Sivudu Sivudu Sivudu (1983)
Sri Ranga Neethulu (1983)
Ramudu Kadu Krishnudu (1983)
Maga Maharaju (1983)
Amarajeevi(1983)
Swati (1984)
Agni Gundam (1984)
Illalu Priyuralu (1984)
Koteeswarudu(1984)
Tandava Krishnudu(1984)  
Anubandham (1984)
Goonda (1984)
Kathanayakudu (1984)
Bava Maradallu-Sobhanbabu movie (1984)
Pratighatana (1985)
Devaalayam (1985)
Vande Mataram (1985)
Chattamtho Poratam (1985)
Sravanthi (1985)
Pattabhishekam (1985)
Donga (1985)
Mangalya Balam-Sobhanbabu movie (1985)
Adavi Donga (1985)
Agni Parvatam(1985)
Mugguru Mithrulu(1985)
Maharaju-Sobhanbabu Telugu movie (1985)
పల్నాటి సింహంPalnati Simham (1985)
వజ్రాయుధం Vajrayudham (1985)
Vikram-Nagarjuna Debut Film (1986)
Kaliyuga Pandavulu-Venkatesh Debut(1986)
Repati Pourulu (1986)
Aranya Kaanda (1986)
Sravana Meghalu (1986)
Kaliyuga Krishnudu (1986)
Chantabbai (1986)
Kondaveeti Raja (1986)
Jeevana Poratam (1986)
Nippulanti Manishi (1986)
Sravana Sandhya-Sobhanbabu movie (1986)
Samsaram Oka Chadarangam (1987)
Makutamleni Maharaju (1987)
Chakravarthy (1987)
Jebu Donga (1987)
Donga Mogudu (1987)
Pasivadi Pranam (1987)
Chinababu (1988)
Manchi Donga (1988)
Donga Pelli (1988)
Shakthi (1988)(Kannada)
Attaku Yamudu Ammayiki Mogudu (1989)
Lorry Driver (1990)
Amma Rajinama (1991)
Golmaal Govindam (1992)
Pellam Chebite Vinali (1992)
Hendthi Helidare Helabeku (1992) (Kannada)
Raja (1999 Indian film1999(Telugu) (Cameo role as a music director)
Pratibimbalu (2022)

Awards
Nandi Awards
Best Music Director - Neti Bharatam (1983)
Best Music Director - Sravana Meghalu (1986)

References

Telugu film score composers
Kannada film score composers
Film musicians from Andhra Pradesh
1936 births
2002 deaths
20th-century Indian composers
People from Guntur district